Squash at the 2014 Commonwealth Games was held at the Scotstoun Sports Campus from 24 July to 3 August 2014.

Schedule
All times are British Summer Time (UTC+1)

Medal table

Medallists

Participating nations 
A total of 119 players from 28 nations will compete in squash at the 2014 Commonwealth Games :

References

External links
Official results book – Squash

 
2014
2014 in squash
2014 Commonwealth Games events
Squash in Scotland